Canada competed at the 2019 World Championships in Athletics in Doha, Qatar, from 27 September–6 October 2019.

Medalists 
The following competitors from Canada won medals at the Championships

Results

Men
Track and road events

Field events

Combined events – Decathlon

Women 
Track and road events

Field events

Mixed

Track and road events

References

Sources 
Provisional Canadian team named August 20
Athletics Canada official roster for the games.

Nations at the 2019 World Athletics Championships
World Championships in Athletics
2019